Rida Cador (born 25 March 1981 in Tata) is a Hungarian former cyclist.

Major results

2007
 1st Stage 2 Tour of Szeklerland
 5th Overall Tour de Hongrie
 8th Overall Paths of Victory Tour
2008
 1st Overall Tour of Romania
1st Stage 4
 4th Road race, National Road Championships
 4th GP Betonexpressz 2000
 7th Overall Tour of Szeklerland
 8th GP Palma
2009
 National Road Championships
1st  Time trial
2nd Road race
2010
 5th Road race, National Road Championships
 7th Overall The Paths of King Nikola
2011
 1st  Road race, National Road Championships
 8th Overall Cycling Tour of Sibiu
2013
 1st Overall Grand Prix Cycliste de Gemenc
1st Stages 2 & 3

References

1981 births
Living people
Hungarian male cyclists